is a private school for girls in Shirokane, Minato, Tokyo. Founded in 1908, it serves grades 1–12, from elementary school through senior high school. It is a part of the Sacred Heart Schools network, affiliated with the University of the Sacred Heart in Tokyo.

Notable alumni 
 Momoko Abe, Miss Universe Japan 2017
 Empress Michiko, Empress consort of Japan to Emperor Akihito. 
 Princess Tomohito of Mikasa
 Hisako, Princess Takamado
 Yasuko Konoe (kindergarten), former member of the Imperial House of Japan
 Hidé Ishiguro, philosopher
 Sadako Ogata, diplomat
 Ayako Sono, writer
 Maria Mori, singer
 Yūko Nakagawa, politician
 Akie Abe, Japanese socialite and widow of Shinzo Abe
 Naomi Tokashiki, politician
 Kaori Ishikawa, politician
 Miyako Tanaka, swimmer
 Rina Kitagawa, voice actress
 Mariko Oi, BBC reporter

References

External links
 Sacred Heart School in Tokyo
 Sacred Heart School in Tokyo 

High schools in Tokyo
Schools in Tokyo
Catholic schools in Japan
Women in Tokyo